Neil Turner is an English former professional rugby league footballer who played in the 1980s and 1990s.

Turner won the Rugby League Premiership final with Hull F.C. in 1991 after joining from Doncaster. He is a former detective with the South Yorkshire Police.

Premiership Final appearances
Neil Turner played , in Hull FC's 14-4 victory over Widnes in the Premiership Final during the 1990–91 season at Old Trafford, Manchester on Sunday 12 May 1991.

References

Living people
Doncaster R.L.F.C. players
English rugby league players
Hull F.C. players
Place of birth missing (living people)
British police officers
Rugby league wingers
Year of birth missing (living people)